Michael Karl Kellogg (born October 28, 1942) is a former American football fullback who played two seasons with the Denver Broncos of the American Football League. He played college football at Santa Clara University and attended Long Beach Polytechnic High School in Long Beach, California.

He a former judge of the Los Angeles County Superior Court; he retired in 2018.

References

External links
Just Sports Stats

Living people
1942 births
Players of American football from Tucson, Arizona
American football fullbacks
Santa Clara Broncos football players
Denver Broncos (AFL) players
Superior court judges in the United States
Long Beach Polytechnic High School alumni